Yar is the name of several rural localities in Russia:

Yar, Baykalovsky District, Sverdlovsk Oblast, a village in Baykalovsky District, Sverdlovsk Oblast
Yar, Talitsky District, Sverdlovsk Oblast, a selo in Talitsky District, Sverdlovsk Oblast
Yar, Tugulymsky District, Sverdlovsk Oblast, a selo in Tugulymsky District, Sverdlovsk Oblast
Yar, Turinsky District, Sverdlovsk Oblast, a village in Turinsky District, Sverdlovsk Oblast
Yar, Tomsk Oblast, a selo in Tomsky District of Tomsk Oblast
Yar, Tyumensky District, Tyumen Oblast, a selo in Yembayevsky Rural Okrug of Tyumensky District of Tyumen Oblast
Yar, Uvatsky District, Tyumen Oblast, a village in Alymsky Rural Okrug of Uvatsky District of Tyumen Oblast
Yar, Yalutorovsky District, Tyumen Oblast, a village in Singulsky Rural Okrug of Yalutorovsky District of Tyumen Oblast
Yar, Dizminsky Selsoviet, Yarsky District, Udmurt Republic, a village in Dizminsky Selsoviet of Yarsky District of the Udmurt Republic
Yar, Yarsky Selsoviet, Yarsky District, Udmurt Republic, a settlement in Yarsky Selsoviet of Yarsky District of the Udmurt Republic
Yar, Vladimir Oblast, a settlement in Vyaznikovsky District of Vladimir Oblast

See also
Babi Yar, ravine in Kiev where mass murders took place during World War II
Bely Yar, name of several inhabited localities in Russia
Kapustin Yar, Russian rocket launch and development site in Astrakhan Oblast, between Volgograd and Astrakhan, known today as Znamensk
Krasny Yar (disambiguation)